Isahakyan is a village in the Ani Municipality of the Shirak Province of Armenia. It was formerly named after Ghazar Agha who organized the defense of the town against the Persians in 1826–1828; later named after poet Avetik Isahakyan, who lived there.

Demographics

References

External Links 

Populated places in Shirak Province